Borkenau is a surname. Notable people with the surname include:

 Franz Borkenau (1900–1957), Austrian writer and publicist
 Moritz Borkenau (1827–1904), Jewish Austrian financier

Jewish surnames
Yiddish-language surnames